Coal Mountain may refer to:

Coal Mountain, British Columbia, Canada
Coal Mountain Mine
Coal Mountain, Colorado, a peak in the West Elk mountains, U.S.
Coal Mountain, Georgia, U.S.
Coal Mountain, West Virginia, U.S.
Kolfjellet, Norway

See also
 Cool Mountain